Maryborough Airport  is located  northwest of Maryborough, Victoria, Australia.

See also
 List of airports in Victoria

References

Airports in Victoria (Australia)
Maryborough, Victoria